Skyboard is a one-person glider that offers a highly manoeuvrable alternative to skydiving. It was invented by the New Zealander Bob Harris. On being launched from between 10,000 ft and 35,000 ft from either a fixed-wing aircraft or a helicopter Skyboard's front and rear wings, and tail plane are electronically deployed. The pilot, using aileron and elevator control surfaces can then fly the glider before making a wheels-down or parachute-assisted landing.

External links 
Skyboard NZ Ltd
Movie: Skyboard first flight September 2007

Parachuting